The Jamnagar Airport, officially known as Civil Enclave Jamnagar,  is an airport in Jamnagar, Gujarat, India. It is owned by the Indian Air Force and also permits both commercial as well as private flights. It is the only airport in Gujarat which has two runways.

According to a survey conducted by the Gujarat Infrastructure Development Board, traffic at Jamnagar airport grew at 15% between 2003 and 2008. Compared to other airports in Gujarat, Jamnagar airport has low market share but high growth. The domestic passenger demand would increase by 6% between 2016 and 2020.

During the evacuation of Indian nationals from Yemen in April 2015, a C-17 Globemaster of the Indian Air Force was sent to Djibouti from the Jamnagar Airport.

Terminal
Jamnagar Airport has a single terminal spread over 35 acres. It has a capacity to handle 150 passengers at a given time. It has a small lounge including a cafeteria before the check-in counter. There is a conveyor belt in the arrivals area for the luggage. The parking apron adjoining the terminal measures 295 ft x 295 ft and can handle two Airbus A320s simultaneously. The airport has a car parking capacity of about 50 cars.

In 2012, the government announced plans for the expansion of the terminal along with several other airports of the state.

Airlines and destinations

Access

The airport is connected to the city by a four lane highway and is about 8 kilometres from the city.

See also
Ahmedabad Airport

References

External links
 

Airports in Gujarat
Jamnagar
Transport in Jamnagar
Airports with year of establishment missing